Gonzalo Antonio Romero Paz (born 25 March 1975) is a retired Guatemalan football midfielder who last played for local club Deportivo Marquense in the Guatemala's top division.

Club career
Romero joined Guatemalan top side CSD Municipal in 2000 from Cobán Imperial.

International career
He made his debut for the Guatemalan national team in a June 2000 World Cup qualification match against Antigua and Barbuda, coming on as a substitute for Edgar Valencia.
He has, as of January 2010, earned 77 caps, scoring 9 goals and represented his country during the 2006 and 2010 World Cup qualification campaigns.

He also played at three CONCACAF Gold Cup tournaments.

International goals
Scores and results list. Guatemala's goal tally first.

External links
 Player profile - CSD Municipal

References

1975 births
Living people
Sportspeople from Guatemala City
Guatemalan footballers
Guatemala international footballers
C.S.D. Municipal players
2002 CONCACAF Gold Cup players
2003 UNCAF Nations Cup players
2003 CONCACAF Gold Cup players
2005 UNCAF Nations Cup players
2005 CONCACAF Gold Cup players
2011 CONCACAF Gold Cup players
Association football midfielders
Cobán Imperial players
Deportivo Marquense players
Aurora F.C. players